Balmoral is an unincorporated village north of Winnipeg located within the boundaries of the Rural Municipality of Rockwood, Manitoba.

The Post Office opened in 1879 to service the early settlers who began arriving in the area in 1874. There was also a Canadian Pacific railway point on 6-15-2E. The community was named after Balmoral Castle in Scotland. A School District was located on SW7-15-2E. The community was originally known as Quickfall.

See also 

 List of communities in Manitoba

References 

 Geographic Names of Manitoba - Balmoral (pg. 17) published by the Millennium Bureau of Canada
 Balmoral, Manitoba

Unincorporated communities in Manitoba